This is a list of Cypriot football transfers in the winter transfer window, by club. Only clubs of the 2022–23 Cypriot First Division are included.

2022-23 Cypriot First Division

AEK Larnaca

In:

Out:

AEL Limassol

In:

Out:

Akritas Chlorakas

In:

Out:

Anorthosis Famagusta

In:

Out:

APOEL

In:

Out:

Apollon Limassol

In:

Out:

Aris Limassol

In:

Out:

Doxa Katokopias

In:

Out:

Enosis Neon Paralimni

In:

Out:

Karmiotissa

In:

Out:

Nea Salamis Famagusta

In:

Out:

Olympiakos Nicosia

In:

Out:

Omonia

In:

Out:

Pafos

In:

Out:

References

Cyprus